Fairfax Blomfield Wade-Palmer FRIBA, JP (1851 – 11 January 1919) was an English architect responsible for several buildings that are now listed by Historic England. He was also a noted textile designer. He was educated at Radley College. He was a justice of the peace.

Selected works
 54 Mount Street, London.
 64 Sloane Street.
 Colet House, 151 Talgarth Road, London W14.
 Sherfield Manor (parts)
Compton House, Denton, Northamptonshire
Condover Church, Shropshire - restoration of 1878.

References

External links 

1851 births
1919 deaths
Architects from London
Textile designers
Fellows of the Royal Institute of British Architects
English justices of the peace
People educated at Radley College